Athletics events at the 1998 South American Games were held at the  Coliseo Mayor de Deportes Jefferson Pérez next to the Estadio Alejandro Serrano Aguilar in Cuenca, Ecuador, between October 26–30, 1998.  A total of 45 events were contested, 24 by men and 21 by women.
Brazil and Venezuela did not participate in the athletics events.

For the first time, a minimum participation of 4 nations per event was
required to award a full set of medals.  Men's triple jump and women's 4 x 400 m relay
events were concerned, where athletes coming in third did not get bronze
medals.  Women's marathon was completely cancelled, because
there would have been only athletes from host country Ecuador.

Medal summary

Medal winners were published in a book by written Argentinian journalist Ernesto Rodríguez III with support of the Argentine Olympic Committee (Spanish: Comité Olímpico Argentino) under the auspices of the Ministry of Education (Spanish: Ministerio de Educación de la Nación) in collaboration with the Office of Sports (Spanish: Secretaría de Deporte de la Nación).  Eduardo Biscayart supplied the list of winners and their results. Further results were published elsewhere, or can be found in athlete's IAAF biographies.

All results are marked as "affected by altitude" (A), because the stadium in
Cuenca is situated 2536 m above sea level.

Men

Notes
†: No medal because of lack of minimum participation.

Women

Notes
†: No medal because of lack of minimum participation.

Medal table (unofficial)

Notes
†: In contrast to the unofficial count above, only 15 gold, 14
silver and 19 bronze medals for Ecuador are published.
There might have been further events than marked above falling short of
participants leading to a reduced number of medals.

References

1998
International athletics competitions hosted by Ecuador
South American Games
1998 South American Games